Oscar Smith may refer to:

Oscar Smith (American football) (born 1963), American football running back in the NFL for the Detroit Lions
Oscar Smith (gymnast) (born 1991), Swedish trampolinist
Oscar Smith (actor) (1885-1956), African American actor
Oscar J. Smith (1859–1937), American lawyer and politician
Oscar Franklin Smith (born 1950), American man on death row in Tennessee

See also
Oscar F. Smith High School, public high school in Chesapeake, Virginia, named for local civic leader Oscar Frommel Smith
Johan Oscar Smith (1871–1943), Norwegian Christian leader
William Oscar Smith (1917–1991), American jazz double bassist and music educator